Vriesea delicatula is a plant species in the genus Vriesea. This species is endemic to Brazil.

Cultivars
 Vriesea 'Gold Splash'
 Vriesea 'Golden Wings'
 Vriesea 'Goldilocks'
 Vriesea 'Red Wings'
 Vriesea 'Starburst'
 Vriesea 'Tropic Night'

References

BSI Cultivar Registry Retrieved 11 October 2009

delicatula
Flora of Brazil